Talk About Love may refer to:

 "Talk About Love" (Christine Anu song), 2003
 "Talk About Love" (Zara Larsson song), 2020